Daniel James Reyburn (born October 13, 1976) is an American Major League Baseball umpire. He wore uniform number 70 when he first came up to MLB, then changed to number 17 starting with the 2018 season.

Early life and education
Reyburn played center field for the Hope College Flying Dutchmen and graduated in December 1999 with a bachelor's degree in Sociology. In January 2000, he enrolled at the umpire school in Florida and graduated after five weeks of training.

Controversy
Reyburn was umpiring in the Dominican League in 2009-2010 when he became the center of media attention on January 16. He ejected Licey Tigers catcher Ronny Paulino for arguing balls and strikes, then was attacked by Licey manager José Offerman. Offerman had to be removed by the police and was banned for 3 years from the Dominican League for the assault.

Umpiring history
Reyburn has been an umpire in the Midwest League (2002), Florida State League (2003), Eastern League (2004–2005) and Pacific Coast League (2006–2009). He worked the Taiwan qualifier of the 2013 World Baseball Classic in November 2012.

See also 

 List of Major League Baseball umpires

References

External links 
 MLB.com
 Retrosheet

1976 births
Living people
Players of American football from Grand Rapids, Michigan
Sportspeople from Grand Rapids, Michigan
Hope College alumni
Hope Flying Dutchmen baseball players
Hope Flying Dutchmen football players
Major League Baseball umpires
Baseball players from Grand Rapids, Michigan